This is a list of the National Register of Historic Places listings in Downtown and Midtown Detroit, Michigan. It is intended to be a complete list of the properties and districts on the National Register of Historic Places in Downtown and Midtown neighborhoods in Detroit, Michigan, United States. Latitude and longitude coordinates are provided for many National Register properties and districts; these locations may be seen together in online maps.

Geographical areas
Downtown Detroit is bounded by the Lodge Freeway (M-10) on the west, the Fisher Freeway (I-75) on the north, Interstate 375 (The Chrysler Spur) on the east, and the Detroit River on the south.

Midtown Detroit is bounded by the Chrysler Freeway (I-75) on the east, the Lodge Freeway on the west, the Edsel Ford Freeway (I-94) on the north, and the Fisher Freeway on the south. Midtown is further divided by Woodward Avenue, which runs north and south through the heart of Midtown, and the east-west streets Warren and Mack/Martin Luther King.
 Wayne State neighborhood: West of Woodward and north of Warren
 North Cass neighborhood: West of Woodward, south of Warren, and north of Martin Luther King
 Cass Park neighborhood: West of Woodward and south of Martin Luther King
 Art Center neighborhood: East of Woodward and north of Warren
 Medical Center neighborhood: East of Woodward, south of Warren, and north of Mack
 Brush Park neighborhood: East of Woodward and south of Mack

There are 128 properties and districts listed on the National Register in Downtown and Midtown Detroit, including five National Historic Landmarks. There are 150 more properties and districts listed on the National Register in the remainder of the city, including five National Historic Landmarks and one property straddling the border with River Rouge, Michigan. These other properties are listed at National Register of Historic Places listings in Detroit.

All together there are 278 properties and districts listed on the National Register in Detroit proper. Nine additional properties and districts, including one National Historic Landmark, are located in the Detroit enclave of Highland Park. Three properties are located in the Detroit enclave of Hamtramck. The properties and districts in these two Detroit enclaves, plus 74 others, are listed in this list of non-Detroit NRHP listings in Wayne County.

History of Detroit

Beginnings

Detroit, settled in 1701, is one of the oldest cities in the Midwest. It experienced a disastrous fire in 1805 which nearly destroyed the city, leaving little present-day evidence of old Detroit save a few east-side streets named for early French settlers, their ancestors, and some pear trees which were believed to have been planted by early missionaries. After the fire, Judge Augustus B. Woodward designed a plan of evenly spaced public parks with interconnecting semi-circular and diagonal streets. Although Woodward's plan was not fully implemented, the basic outline in still in place today in the heart of the city. Main thoroughfares radiate outward from the center of the city like spokes in a wheel, with Jefferson Avenue running parallel to the river, Woodward Avenue running perpendicular to it, and Gratiot, Michigan, and Grand River Avenues interspersed. A sixth main street, Fort, wanders downriver from the center of the city.

After Detroit rebuilt in the early 19th century, a thriving community soon sprang up, and by the Civil War, over 45,000 people were living in the city, primarily spread along Jefferson Avenue to the east and Fort Street to the west. As in many major American cities, subsequent redevelopment of the central city through the next 150 years has eliminated all but a handful of the antebellum structures in Detroit. The oldest remaining structures are those built as private residences, including a group in the Corktown neighborhood and another set of houses strung along Jefferson Avenue — notably the Charles Trowbridge House (1826, the oldest known structure in the city), the Joseph Campau House (1835), the Sibley House (1848), the Beaubien House (1851), and the Moross House (1855). Other extant pre-1860 structures include Fort Wayne (1849); Saints Peter and Paul Church (1848) and Mariners' Church (1849); and scattered commercial buildings (one in Randolph Street Commercial Buildings Historic District, for example). Unfortunately, the demolition of historic structures continues into the present day: multiple structures listed on the Register have been demolished in the last decade.

Rise of industry and commerce
As Detroit grew into a thriving hub of commerce and industry, the city spread along Jefferson, with multiple manufacturing firms taking advantage of the transportation resources afforded by the river and a parallel rail line. The shipyard that eventually became the Dry Dock Complex opened on the Detroit River at the foot of Orleans in 1852; Parke-Davis established a complex between East Jefferson Avenue and the river in the 1870s; another pharmaceutical firm, Frederick Stearns & Company, built a manufacturing plant in the same area in the 1890s. Globe Tobacco built a manufacturing facility closer to downtown in 1888.

The rise of manufacturing led to a new class of wealthy industrialists, entrepreneurs, and professionals. Some of these nouveau riche built along East Jefferson, resulting in structures such as the Thomas A. Parker House (1868), the Croul-Palms House (1881), the William H. Wells House (1889), the John N. Bagley House (1889), and the Frederick K. Stearns House (1902). However, Detroit began increasingly to turn away from the river, and other citizens pushed north of downtown, building houses along Woodward in what was at the time a quiet residential area. Many of these neighborhoods have disappeared under 20th-century commercialization of the Woodward corridor, but some Victorian structures remain, notably the Elisha Taylor House (1870) and the Hudson-Evans House (1872), both near the Woodward East Historic District; and the Col. Frank J. Hecker House (1888) and the Charles Lang Freer House (1887) in the East Ferry Avenue Historic District. Near the end of the century, apartment living became more acceptable for affluent middle-class families, and upscale apartments, such as the Coronado Apartments (1894), the Verona Apartments (1894), the Palms Apartments (1903), the Davenport Apartments (1905) in the Cass-Davenport Historic District, and the Garden Court Apartments (1915) were constructed to meet the new demand.

These well-to-do late-19th-century residents also funded the construction of a spate of churches, such as the Cass Avenue Methodist Episcopal Church (1883), the First Presbyterian Church (1889), the Trinity Episcopal Church (1890) (built by James E. Scripps), and the First Unitarian Church (1890).

Immigration
Detroit has long been a city of immigrants, from the early French and English settlers in the 18th century, through the Irish who settled in the Corktown neighborhood in the 1840s, to the Greeks, who settled in the Greektown neighborhood in the early 20th century and the southern whites and African Americans who came to Detroit in the years before the Great Depression. Detroit's industrial boom in the later 19th century created yet another stream of immigrants into Detroit. Perhaps the most significant contingents during this period were the German and Polish immigrants who settled in Detroit in the 1860–1890s. Germans came first, establishing German-speaking churches, primarily on the east side of the city, including St. John's-St. Luke's Evangelical Church (1872), St. Joseph Catholic Church (1873), and Sacred Heart Roman Catholic Church (1875), as well as social clubs such as the Harmonie Club (1894) and west-side churches such as St. Boniface (1882) and Gethsemane Evangelical Lutheran Church (1891). Close behind, a wave of Polish immigrants established east-side Roman Catholic parishes such as St. Albertus (1885), Sweetest Heart of Mary (1893), St. Josaphat's (1901), St. Stanislaus (1911), and St. Thomas the Apostle Church (1923). The Poles also settled on the west side, founding West Side Dom Polski (1916).

Birth of the automobile
At the turn of the 20th century, entrepreneurs in the Detroit area—notably Henry Ford—forged into production of the automobile, capitalizing on the already-existing machine tool and coach-building industry in the city. Early automotive production is recognizable by structures such as the Ford Piquette Avenue Plant (1904) (a National Historic Landmark), and multiple structures in the surrounding Piquette Avenue Industrial Historic District (including the now-destroyed E-M-F/Studebaker Plant, 1906) and the New Amsterdam Historic District (including the original Cadillac factory, 1905) and small factories such as the Crescent Brass and Pin Company Building (1905).

Automobile assembly and associated manufacturing soon dominated Detroit, and the newly minted automotive magnates built commercial and office buildings such as General Motors Building (1919), the General Motors Research Laboratory (1928), and the Fisher Building (1928).

Changes wrought by the automobile
The development of the automobile industry led to rising demands for labor, which were filled by huge numbers of newcomers from Europe and the American South. Between 1900 and 1930, the city's population soared from 265,000 to over 1.5 million, pushing the boundaries of the city outward. The population boom led to the construction of apartment buildings across the city, aimed at the middle-class auto worker. These include the Somerset Apartments (1922), the Garden Court Apartments (1915), and the Manchester Apartments (1915).

At the same time, new upscale neighborhoods farther from the center of the city sprang up, including Boston-Edison, Indian Village, and Palmer Woods. The wealthy moved into these more exclusive neighborhoods as the once-exclusive Woodward Avenue neighborhoods (such as the Warren-Prentis Historic District and the Willis-Selden Historic District) became mixed with apartments and commercial buildings. As the population spread outwards, new churches were constructed to serve the newly populated areas, notably the Roman Catholic Cathedral of the Most Blessed Sacrament (1913), the Woodward Avenue Presbyterian Church (1908), the Metropolitan United Methodist Church (1922), and the St. Theresa of Avila Roman Catholic Church (1919).

The rise of the automobile also required rethinking transportation within the city. The Chestnut Street-Grand Trunk Railroad bridge (1929) was a result of a grade separation that unsnarled train and automobile traffic. The Fort Street–Pleasant Street and Norfolk & Western Railroad Viaduct (1928) was a product of the same program, routing trucking trafficover the train traffic. And the West Jefferson Avenue–Rouge River Bridge (1922) allowed the Rouge River to be expanded for barge traffic.

Automobile wealth led to a boom in downtown Detroit business, and the construction of a collection of early-20th-century skyscrapers. The most notable of these is the Art Deco National Historic Landmark Guardian Building (1928), but numerous other significant office buildings such as the Vinton Building (1916), the Barlum Tower (1927), and the Lawyers Building (1922) were also constructed. The building boom was not confined to businesses. Shopping districts sprang up along Park Avenue, Broadway, and Woodward. Multiple hotels were constructed, including the Fort Shelby Hotel (1916), the Detroit-Leland Hotel (1927), the Royal Palm (1924), and many others. Extravagant movie theaters such as the Fox (1928) and the Palms (1925) were constructed. And public buildings, such as Orchestra Hall (1919), the Detroit Public Library (1921), and the Detroit Institute of Arts (1923).

African-Americans
During the early years of Detroit, the African-American population was relatively small. However, the Second Baptist Church (1857; rebuilt 1914) was founded with an African-American congregation in the 1830s; the church played an instrumental role in the Underground Railroad, due to Detroit's proximity to Canada. The auto boom of the 20th century changed the population, and in the years following World War I, the black population of Detroit soared. In 1910, fewer than 6000 blacks called the city home; in 1917 more than 30,000 blacks lived in Detroit. Significant African-American structures in Detroit are related to the struggle with segregation: Dunbar Hospital (founded 1914), the Ossian H. Sweet House (1925), and the Sugar Hill neighborhood. However, other structures, such as the Breitmeyer-Tobin Building (1905) are tributes to the slow integration in the latter half of the 20th century.

Architecture
A number of notable architects worked in Detroit, including D. H. Burnham & Company; Donaldson and Meier; McKim, Mead and White; Smith, Hinchman and Grylls (and Wirt C. Rowland); and Minoru Yamasaki. However, Albert Kahn deserves special recognition for the scope and variety of his work in the city, and the number of Kahn-buildings listed in the National Register. Kahn designed large industrial buildings such as the Highland Park Ford Plant (1908) in nearby Highland Park (a National Historic Landmark), Fisher Body Plant 21 (1921) in the Piquette Avenue Industrial Historic District, and his addition to the Frederick Stearns Building (1906).

Kahn's output extended to a range of building types, notably office buildings such as the General Motors Building (1919) and the Fisher Building (1928) — both National Historic Landmarks — as well as the Edwin S. George Building (1908), the Vinton Building (1916), the S. S. Kresge World Headquarters (1928), the Griswold Building (1929), and a string of banks and highrises in the Detroit Financial District. Kahn also designed private homes (the Bernard Ginsburg House, 1898; the Albert Kahn House, 1906; and homes in Boston-Edison, Rosedale Park, and Indian Village), apartment and hotel buildings (the Palms Apartments, 1903; the Addison Hotel in the Midtown Woodward Historic District, 1905, Garden Court Apartments, 1915; and 1001 Covington in the Palmer Park Apartment Building Historic District, 1925), churches (the 1903 Temple Beth-El; the 1923 Temple Beth-El; and additions on the First Congregational Church, 1921), and theatres (the National Theatre, 1911).

Current listings

|}

Listings formerly located in Downtown/Midtown Detroit
The following listing was located in Downtown/Midtown Detroit at the time it was placed on the Register, but has since moved to another location.

Former listings

|}

See also
 National Register of Historic Places listings in Detroit
 National Register of Historic Places listings in Wayne County, Michigan
 National Register of Historic Places listings in Michigan
List of Michigan State Historic Sites in Wayne County, Michigan

References

Downtown
Tourist attractions in Detroit
History of Detroit
National Register of Historic Places, Downtown and Midtown